Vaqeeh Dasht (also Romanized as Vāqe‘eh Dasht; also known as Vāqafeh Dasht) is a village in Kasma Rural District, in the Central District of Sowme'eh Sara County, Gilan Province, Iran. At the 2006 census, its population was 496, in 133 families.

References 

Populated places in Sowme'eh Sara County